Dead Sea Discoveries is a peer-reviewed academic journal covering the study of the Dead Sea Scrolls. It is published by Brill Academic Publishers and the editor-in-chief is Molly M. Zahn of the University of Kansas.

History

The journal was established in 1994. Previous editors include George J. Brooke, James VanderKam, Lawrence H. Schiffman, Eibert Tigchelaar (2007-2012) and Charlotte Hempel.

Abstracting and indexing

The journal is included in the Scopus database and Web of Science. According to the Scimago Journal and Country Rank, the journal has a 2021 SJR-score of 0.231.

References

External links

Biblical studies journals
Publications established in 1994
English-language journals
Dead Sea Scrolls